Granular applicator is a machine that applies granular fertiliser, pesticide, such as slug pellets or Avadex, or insecticide. 

Granular applicators are used for precision application of solids to improve crop yields and quality. Application rates are often controlled electronically to improve accuracy.

Types of granular applicators 
 Demountable
 
 Self-propelled

Granular applicator manufacturers

UK 
 Lite-Trac
 Horstine
 Opico

America 
 Sutton Agricultural Enterprises Inc
 Gandy

Canada 
 Valmar

References

Agricultural machinery